Stewart Ferris is a British writer from Chichester. He first came to prominence with books based on working holidays busking in mainland Europe: The Buskers' Guide to Europe, Don't Lean Out of the Window and Don't Mention the War, (the latter two co-authored with Paul Bassett). With Alastair Williams he co-founded Summersdale Publishers in 1990. He was nominated one of Britain's 'Most Eligible Bachelors' by Company magazine (1996) and wrote a series of tongue-in-cheek guides to relationships and dating.

His television work includes writing episodes of Pokémon, co-writing and performing the theme song to Channel 4's Meet Ricky Gervais, and writing and presenting the documentary The Mystery of Rennes-le-Chateau (2006).

He has written over forty books, including The Key to The Da Vinci Code (Crombie Jardine, 2005), Tish and Pish: How to be of a Speakingness like Stephen Fry (Summersdale, 2005) and How to be a Writer (Summersdale, 2013). His debut novel, The Sphinx Scrolls (Headline Accent, 2016), was followed by a series of light-hearted novels and novellas all featuring a Bertie Wooster influenced hero, Ratty Ballashiels. The works include: The Sphinx Swindle (Headline Accent, 2017); The Dali Diaries (Headline Accent, 2017); The Genesis Glitch (Headline Accent, 2017); The Chaplin Conspiracy (Headline Accent, 2018).

He is currently studying for a PhD in Creative Writing.

References

External links
Stewart Ferris official website
TV credits on IMDB.com

Living people
Year of birth missing (living people)
British male singer-songwriters
British non-fiction writers
British male novelists
British male screenwriters
British television presenters
Male non-fiction writers